German submarine U-738 was a Type VIIC U-boat of Nazi Germany's Kriegsmarine built for service during World War II. Her keel was laid down on 25 February 1942 by Schichau-Werke of Danzig. She was commissioned on 20 February 1943 with Oberleutnant zur See Erich-Michael Hoffmann in command.

Design
German Type VIIC submarines were preceded by the shorter Type VIIB submarines. U-738 had a displacement of  when at the surface and  while submerged. She had two shafts and two  propellers.

U-738 was fitted with five  torpedo tubes (four fitted at the bow and one at the stern), fourteen torpedoes, one  SK C/35 naval gun, 220 rounds, and two twin  C/30 anti-aircraft guns. The boat had a complement of between forty-four and sixty.

References

Bibliography

External links

German Type VIIC submarines
World War II submarines of Germany
1942 ships
Ships built in Danzig
Ships built by Schichau